Dennis D. Johnson (born February 26, 1956 in Weir, Mississippi) is a former American football fullback and Tight end in the National Football League for the Buffalo Bills and New York Giants.  He played college football at Mississippi State University and was drafted in the third round of the 1978 NFL Draft.

Professional career

Buffalo Bills
The Buffalo Bills selected him in the 3rd round (59th overall) of the 1978 NFL Draft. He played in 16 games during their 1978 season and in the first three games of their 1979 season. On October 6, 1979, Johnson was placed on the injured reserve list with a knee injury for the remainder of the 1979 season. The Bills released him on September 3, 1980.

New York Giants
Johnson signed with the New York Giants as a tight end on December 3, 1980 and he played in the final two games of the 1980 season.   He returned in 1981, but was placed on the injured reserve list with a knee problem on August 3, 1981 through the entire 1981 season.

Boston/New Orleans Breakers
On February 3, 1983, he signed with the Boston Breakers of the United States Football League. During the Breakers' 1983 season, he rushed for 165 yards on 44 carries with one touchdown and had one touchdown reception. He also scored on a two-point conversion. The Breakers cut him on January 28, 1984.

Pittsburgh Maulers
On June 7, 1984, Johnson signed with the Pittsburgh Maulers of the United States Football League.

References

1956 births
Living people
People from Choctaw County, Mississippi
American football fullbacks
Mississippi State Bulldogs football players
Buffalo Bills players
New York Giants players
Boston/New Orleans/Portland Breakers players
Pittsburgh Maulers players
Players of American football from Mississippi